The following is a list of people who have served as mayors of the city of El Paso in the U.S state of Texas.

List of Mayors of El Paso

References

El Paso, Texas